

The Yakovlev AIR-5 was a prototype Soviet single-engined cabin monoplane designed by the Yakovlev design bureau. The AIR-5 was a high-wing strut-braced monoplane with a  Wright J-4 Whirlwind engine. It had a tubular steel fuselage, wooden wings and an enclosed cabin for a pilot and three passengers.

When the Whirlwind engine became unavailable no further aircraft were produced and a smaller variant was designed with a locally produced M-11 radial engine and designated the AIR-6.

Specifications

References

Notes

Bibliography

 
 

1930s Soviet civil utility aircraft
AIR-5
High-wing aircraft
Aircraft first flown in 1931